Andrzej Ruciński (born 25 October 1958) is a Polish politician. He was elected to the Sejm on 25 September 2005, getting 2366 votes in 37 Konin district as a candidate from Samoobrona Rzeczpospolitej Polskiej list.

See also
Members of Polish Sejm 2005-2007

External links
Andrzej Ruciński - parliamentary page - includes declarations of interest, voting record, and transcripts of speeches.

1958 births
Living people
People from Koło County
Members of the Polish Sejm 2005–2007
Self-Defence of the Republic of Poland politicians